Turpakhlu (also Romanized as Tūrpākhlū; also known as Tarpakhloo, Torpākhlū, Towprākhlū, and Turappaklu) is a village in Khararud Rural District, in the Central District of Khodabandeh County, Zanjan Province, Iran. At the 2006 census, its population was 376, in 90 families.

References 

Populated places in Khodabandeh County